Nam Avar (also Romanized as Nām Āvar and Nimewar; also known as Āvar) is a village in Shahrabad Rural District, in the Central District of Firuzkuh County, Tehran Province, Iran. At the 2006 census, its population was 274, in 76 families.

References 

Populated places in Firuzkuh County